VRHS may refer to:
 Valley Regional High School, Deep River, Connecticut
 Villa Rica High School, Villa Rica, Georgia
 Vista Ridge High School, Cedar Park, Texas